WSBY-FM (98.9 MHz) is a commercial FM radio station licensed to Salisbury, Maryland, and serving the Delmarva Peninsula.  It broadcasts an urban adult contemporary radio format and is known as "Magic 98.9."  It is owned by iHeartMedia, Inc.  On weekdays, it carries two nationally syndicated shows from co-owned Premiere Networks:  The Steve Harvey Morning Show and The Sweat Hotel with Keith Sweat heard evenings.

WSBY-FM has an effective radiated power (ERP) of 6,000 watts.  The radio studios and offices are at Gateway Crossing on Tilghman Road.  The transmitter is on Old Eden Road in Fruitland, Maryland, off U.S. Route 13.

History
It was acquired by Clear Channel Communications in 2000. Clear Channel was a forerunner to today's iHeartMedia. WSBY-FM has served the African-American community for most of its history.

References

External links

SBY-FM
Urban adult contemporary radio stations in the United States
IHeartMedia radio stations